Mikael Stenmark (born 1962) is a Swedish philosopher who is Dean of the Faculty of Theology since 2008 and Professor of Philosophy of Religion at the Department of Theology, Uppsala University, Sweden. He has published papers in the philosophy of religion, the philosophy of science, and environmental ethics and on science-religion issues. Stenmark is the author of "Rationality in Science, Religion and Everyday Life" (1995), for which he was awarded The John Templeton Foundation Prize for Outstanding Books in Theology and the Natural Sciences in 1996.

Selected bibliography 
 Rationality in Science, Religion and Everyday Life: Four Models of Rationality (1995) 
 Scientism: Science, Ethics and Religion (2001) 
 Environmental Ethics and Policy-Making (2002) 
 How To Relate Science And Religion: A Multidimensional Model (2004)

Lectures 

References

Living people
1962 births
Academic staff of Uppsala University
Swedish philosophers